Ampersand is a typographical symbol (&).

Ampersand may also refer to:

Fiction 
 A fictional character from the science fiction novel Axiom's End
 A fictional character in the comic book series Y: The Last Man
 The fictional city Ampersand, setting of the webcomic Saturnalia

Music 
 "Ampersand", a song by Amanda Palmer from Who Killed Amanda Palmer, 2008
 "Ampersand", song on the 2005 rock album Side One

Organizations 
 Ampersand Network, a not-for-profit organization encouraging volunteering for young people in Australia
 Ampersand Capital Partners, former owner of Viracor-IBT Laboratories
 Ampersand Publishing, owner of Santa Barbara News-Press

People 
 Tammy Ampersand, stage name of singer-songwriter Kim Deal

Places 
 Ampersand Mountain, a mountain in New York State

Publications 
 Ampersand's Entertainment Guide, originally Ampersand, a college magazine supplement
 Ampersand (magazine), a student newspaper at Wyższa Szkoła Biznesu – National-Louis University
 Ampersand, an online magazine at the USC Annenberg School for Communication and Journalism
 The Ampersand, Eton College school magazine

Other uses 
 BAE Systems Ampersand, an unmanned autonomous flight system
 Bushey railway station, Hertfordshire, England, known as Ampersand in WWII

See also
 & (disambiguation)
 And (disambiguation)